Stenstrup is a town located on the island of Funen in south-central Denmark, in Svendborg Municipality.

Notable people 
 Kenneth Andersen (born 1967 in Stenstrup) a Danish football manager; most recently the manager of Danish Superliga club FC Midtjylland

References 

Cities and towns in the Region of Southern Denmark
Svendborg Municipality